Nephele bipartita is a moth of the family Sphingidae. It is known from lowland forest and heavy woodland from West Africa to the coast of Kenya and Tanzania and to Malawi and Mozambique.

References

Nephele (moth)
Moths described in 1878
Moths of Africa